Dek hor (also Dorm or My School) is a 2006 Thai horror-drama film.

Plot
In Thailand, young Ton Chatree (Trairat) is sent to a boarding school by his father to get good grades and does not tell his mother about his father having an affair. Once in the school, Ton feels like an outcast and misses his family and friends. His new schoolmates tell ghost stories about a boy who died in the school swimming pool and a young pregnant woman who committed suicide.  The stories frighten him, thereby exacerbating Ton's difficulties adjusting to the school. However, Ton becomes close friends with another lonely boy, Vichien (Chienthaworn), who Ton later discovers is the boy who drowned, and his death repeats every night. Ton finds a way to help his friend rest in peace.

At the same time, Ms. Pranee (Sukapatana), the school administrator, is deeply troubled by Vichien's death because she believes incorrectly that Vichien committed suicide and that it was partly her fault.  At the end of the movie, Ton tells Pranee the truth, that Vichien's death was an accident and that Pranee should not blame herself.

Cast
 Charlie Trairat as Ton
 Chintara Sukapatana as Ms. Pranee
 Sirachuch Chienthaworn as Vichien
 Suttipong Tudpitakkul as Ton's father
 Jirat Sukchaloen as Peng
 Thanabodin Sukserisup as Doc Nui
 Pakasit Pantural as Pok
 Nipawan Taweepornsawan as Ton's mother

Reception

Box office, critical reception
The film was screened at the 2006 Bangkok International Film Festival.  It opened in wide release in Thailand on February 23, 2006, and was the No. 1 film that weekend, earning nearly US$544,000. The film has had theatrical releases in Singapore and Malaysia and at other film festivals, including the Pusan International Film Festival.

It received praise from critics for the performances of the child actors and Chintara Sukapatana, as well as for its color-drained photography and the production design of the old boarding school.

Production 
The film was co-written and directed by Songyos Sugmakanan, one of the six directors of the 2003 hit Thai film Fan Chan, which also starred Charlie Trairat. The film was critically acclaimed in Thailand, where it won more honors than any other film, including best picture from the Bangkok Critics Assembly.

Awards
 2007 Berlin Film Festival – Crystal Bear Award for best film in Generation Kplus competition, awarded by 11-member children's jury.
 2007 Fajr International Film Festival – Crystal Simorgh for best director in the Spiritual Films Competition.
 Thailand National Film Association Awards 
Best editing
Best art direction
 Golden Doll Awards
 Best actor (Charlie Trairat)
 Best actress (Chintara Sukapatana)
 Best script
 Bangkok Critics Assembly Awards
 Best picture
 Best director (Songyos Sugmakanan)
 Best script
 Best cinematography
 Starpics Awards
Best picture
Best supporting actress (Chintara Sukapatana)
Best script
Best editing
 Kom Chad Luek Awards
Best supporting actor (Sirachuch Chienthaworn)
Best supporting actress (Chintara Sukapatana)

See also
List of ghost films

References

External links
 
 

2006 films
Thai ghost films
GMM Tai Hub films
2000s horror drama films
Thai horror films
Thai-language films
2006 horror films
2006 drama films